The Indianapolis Athletic Club was a private social "city club" founded in 1920. The Indianapolis Athletic Club building which housed the Club was located at 350 North Meridian Street in Downtown Indianapolis, Indiana. The historic clubhouse was designed by Robert Frost Daggett and built between 1922 and 1924.  It is an Italian Renaissance style brick building. The club closed in 2004 and the building was converted to luxury condominiums.

The Club had over 2,000 members including governors, mayors, legislators, community leaders, business men, and college, professional and Olympic athletes. The building had athletic, social and event space, including the Frank McHale Room, Robert V. Welch Lounge, Frank McKinney Pool and a large ballroom. There were three floors of overnight guest rooms. The other athletic facilities included the pool, a full-court basketball gym, racquetball courts, squash courts, weight room, cardiovascular equipment, and steam room.  

On February 5, 1992 a fire caused by faulty refrigerator wiring killed one overnight guest and two firemen. 

It was added to the National Register of Historic Places in 2015.

References

External links

Clubhouses on the National Register of Historic Places in Indiana
Buildings and structures completed in 1924
Renaissance Revival architecture in Indiana
Buildings and structures in Indianapolis
National Register of Historic Places in Indianapolis